Dastejeh (also Romanized as Dastjeh; also known as Dasteḩeh and Deh Dashteh) is a village in Sahrarud Rural District, in the Central District of Fasa County, Fars Province, Iran. At the 2006 census, its population was 3,447, in 866 families.

References 

Populated places in Fasa County